Andrea Pavani (born 11 November 1954 in Caracas, Venezuela) is an Italian curler.

At the international level, he is a  bronze medallist.

At the national level, he is a fourteen-time Italian men's champion curler.

Teams

Personal life
His father Enea Pavani and sister Marina Pavani are also a curlers and multi-time Italian curling champions.

References

External links
 

Living people
1954 births
Sportspeople from Caracas
Italian male curlers
Italian curling champions